Nebojša Pajkić (born 25 November 1951) is a Serbian screenwriter. He is a professor of film dramaturgy, writer, director and film critic.

Biography
In 1971, Pajkić moved to Belgrade for university studies and ended up staying after graduation.

He was married to a Serbian writer Isidora Bjelica (he co-authored one of her books) whom he met when she was his student on the Belgrade's Film Academy. It is Pajkić's third marriage. He's got a son, Lav and a daughter with Bjelica and a daughter from his second marriage.

Filmography

External links 
 IMDB
 An interview, in Serbian

1951 births
Living people
People from Visoko
Serbs of Bosnia and Herzegovina
Serbian writers
Serbian screenwriters
Male screenwriters
Serbian socialists